Live in New York may refer to:

Hot Swing Trio: Live in New York, 2005 album by Mark O'Connor's Hot Swing Trio
Live in New York (Archie Shepp and Roswell Rudd album), released in 2001
Live in New York (The Doors live album), 6-disc box set released in 2009
Live In New York (The Doors sampler), 2nd disc of The Doors: Box Set, released in 1997
Live in New York (Fred McDowell album), released in 1972
Live in New York (James Brown album), 1981 double album
Live in New York (Joe Cocker album), released in 1981
Live in New York (Kylie Minogue album), released in 2009
Live in New York (Laurie Anderson album), 2-CD album released in 2002
Live in New York (Nektar album), released in 1977
Live in New York (Positive Knowledge album), released in 2003
Live in New York (Sonny Sharrock album), released in 1989
Summer in the City: Live in New York, 2000 album by Joe Jackson and Sheldon Steiger

See also
 Live in New York City (disambiguation)
 Live in NYC (disambiguation)
 MTV Unplugged in New York, a 1994 LP by Nirvana